Li Zhen may refer to:

Li Zhen (Tang dynasty) (627–688), son of Emperor Taizong of Tang
Li Yu, Prince of De (died 905), son of Emperor Zhaozong of Tang, briefly known as Li Zhen at one point
Li Zhen (Later Liang) (died 923), key politician of Later Liang
Li Zhen (female general) (1908–1990), first female general of the Chinese People's Liberation Army
Li Zhen (Minister of Public Security) (1914–1973), Chinese general and Minister of Public Security
Li Zhen (Shandong politician) (1924–2018), chairman of Shandong People's Congress
Li Chen (artist) (born 1963), Taiwanese sculptor
Li Zhen (synchronised swimmer) (born 1979), Chinese synchronized swimmer
Li Zhen (canoeist) (born 1985), Chinese sprint canoeist

See also
Li Chen (disambiguation)